George Cabrera (born 14 December 1988) is a Gibraltarian footballer who plays for Gibraltar Footbal League side Mons Calpe and the Gibraltar national team, where he plays as a striker.

International career
Cabrera was first called up to the Gibraltar senior team in February 2014 for friendlies against Faroe Islands and Estonia on 1 and 5 March 2014. He made his international début with Gibraltar on 26 May 2014 in a 1–1 home draw against Estonia, when he substituted Kyle Casciaro in the 83rd minute. His second appearance came in a 1–0 home victory over Malta on 4 June 2014.

On 16 October 2018, Cabrera scored the equaliser as Gibraltar came from behind to beat Liechtenstein 2-1. This was his first goal for his country.

International goals
Scores and results list Gibraltar's goal tally first.

References

External links
 
 
 
 

1988 births
Living people
Gibraltarian footballers
Gibraltar international footballers
Association football forwards
Tercera División players
Algeciras CF footballers
Lincoln Red Imps F.C. players
F.C. Bruno's Magpies players
Gibraltar Premier Division players